Fox Movietone Follies of 1929, also known as Movietone Follies of 1929 and The William Fox Movietone Follies of 1929, is an American black-and-white and color pre-Code musical film released by Fox Film Corporation.

Plot
George Shelby, a boy from the Southern United States, comes to the city to dissuade Lila, his sweetheart, from embarking on a stage career and finally buys out the controlling interest in the revue so that he can fire her. On the opening night, however, she goes onstage when the prima donna of the show becomes temperamental, and she proves to be a big hit. At this development, George is able to sell the show back to the producer, who had previously lacked confidence in his investment and planned to take advantage of the youth's inexperience.

Cast
 John Breeden as George Shelby
 Lola Lane as Lila Beaumont
 DeWitt Jennings as Jay Darrell
 Sharon Lynn as Ann Foster
 Arthur Stone as Al Leaton
 Stepin Fetchit as Swifty
 Warren Hymer as Martin
 Archie Gottler as Stage Manager
 Arthur Kay as Orchestra leader
 Mario Dominici as Le Maire
 Bobby Burns – unspecified performer (in "Song and Dance Numbers")
 Sue Carol – unspecified performer (in "Song and Dance Numbers")
 Dixie Lee – unspecified performer (in "Song and Dance Numbers")
 Carolynne Snowden – unspecified performer (in "Song and Dance Numbers")
 The Four Covans (uncredited)
 Cee Pee Johnson (uncredited)

Soundtrack

All songs were written by Con Conrad, Archie Gottler and Sidney D. Mitchell.

 "Walking With Susie"
 "Why Can't I Be Like You?"
 "Legs"
 "Breakaway"
 "That's You Baby"
 "Look What You've Done To Me"
 "Big City Blues"
 "Pearl of Old Japan"

Production
Filming locations for Fox Movietone Follies of 1929 included Havana, New York City, and Palm Beach, Florida.

Preservation status
The film had Multicolor sequences in its original release, as well as being filmed in the experimental Grandeur wide-screen process. It is now considered a lost film, as all film prints known to exist were destroyed in fires at the Fox storage facility in New Jersey in 1937. The sequel, New Movietone Follies of 1930, also has Multicolor sequences and exists in the UCLA Film and Television Archive.

Some audio elements of the 1929 film still survive, however. Specifically, "Movietone Sound-on-Disc" audio for reels 6 and 7 still survive, offering the only record of dialogue and music taken directly from the movie.

In addition, several songs from the film were recorded for record release.

See also
List of early color feature films
List of lost films
1937 Fox vault fire

References

External links
 Surviving Vitaphone soundtrack disk at SoundCloud
 
New York Times
OV Guide
Variety

1929 films
1929 musical films
1920s color films
1929 lost films
American musical films
American black-and-white films
Films shot in Florida
Films shot in Havana
Films shot in New York City
Lost American films
Fox Film films
1920s English-language films
1920s American films